Rick and Morty – A Tale of Two Jerries is a graphic novel, written by Kyle Starks and illustrated by CJ Cannon that was released in three parts throughout 2016 and 2017 by Oni Press, as the fifth volume of the comic series based on the television series of the same name by Justin Roiland and Dan Harmon. Part 1, Jerry-Go-Round, was released on December 28, 2016, Part 2, That Thing You Doofus, was released on January 25, 2017, and Part 3, Pacific Rick, was released on February 22, 2017.

The first Rick and Morty comic series arc following Rick Sanchez C-137 and Morty Smith Prime, following the deaths of Rick and Morty C-132 in Head-Space (the first story arc written by Starks after the departure of Zac Gorman), A Tale of Two Jerries (colloquially known as the "Doofus Jerry" arc) is set after the 2014 first season episode "Close Rick-counters of the Rick Kind", and before the events of the 2015 second season episode "Mortynight Run". Published with the one-shots Morty Shines and Tiny Rick (with the backup story Superior Posterior), respectively illustrated by Marc Ellerby and Starks himself, it is followed by the story arc The Rick Identity.

The series is notable for introducing Doofus Jerry, a "viable antagonist" later referenced in the 2017 third season episode "The Ricklantis Mixup", receiving a positive critical reception and later becoming an internet meme.

Premise

Part One: Jerry-Go-Round
Jerry is real tired of being treated like he's worthless, ya know? He works really hard for this family! He deserves a break! So he goes to see his best bud Doofus Rick for some fondue and merry-go-round times. However, their perfect day is interrupted by… Doofus Jerry?! And this guy seems like real bad news, man…

Part Two: That Thing You Doofus
Doofus Jerry is the REAL PIECE OF WORK, MAN. And, somehow, Rick's Achilles' heel. He can't figure out how to beat the dude! Well, if ONE Rick can't solve your Jerry Problems maybe all of them can? Can The Council of Ricks stop Doofus Jerry's before everyone becomes––oh god, no––conquered by a Jerry?

The title is a reference to the 1996 comedy film That Thing You Do!.

Part Three: Pacific Rick
When Jerry is master of the world, how is Rick to survive? By building a GIANT FRICKIN' ROBOT, THAT'S HOW! The Smith family takes on Doofus Jerry in a battle to end all battles. Come for the sweet punching action, stay for the existential ennui.

The title and plot is a reference to the 2013 science fiction kaiju film Pacific Rim.

One-shots

Morty Shines
In this special one-shot and tribute fo Event Horizon, Rick, Morty, and Summer find themselves aboard the space-ship Mr. Mistoffelees, designed by a younger Rick before its disappearance 35 years earlier, into Hell. But could the ship be HAUNTED? Yeah, I mean, it probably is.

Tiny Rick
In this special one-shot and direct sequel to "Big Trouble in Little Sanchez", by the title of which the fifth volume as a whole is occasionally marketed, Morty meets an old friend with a tiny secret: TINY RICK! Meanwhile, in the backup story Superior Posterior, Jerry explores an alternate reality in which he had sacrificed himself to save an alien planet.

Development
In February 2017, Oni Press Managing Editor Ari Yarwood recalled the writing of A Tale of Two Jerries as one of his most "favorite [and] beautiful moments of creativity and humor [o]n this book", attributing the "wonderful secret" of the creation of a "hyper-competent, super-evil dude" in Doofus Jerry to being "because Kyle [Starks] was emailing me about a Doofus Rick idea, and accidentally mixed it up and wrote Doofus Jerry instead, [a]nd then those three amazing "A Tale of Two Jerries" issues got written." Series writer Kyle Starks further expanded to agree that Doofus Jerry could be considered "the ultimate villain of the Rick and Morty universe", indicating interest in having the character return after their apparent death at the conclusion of the arc, with "the Borg feel[ing] like a great comparison[,] right there with (Rick and Morty alien scientist) Zeep in terms of viable antagonists, [a] sort of [d]ark mirror being held up. Also, like, who's worse than Jerry? It's the opposite of Jerry. Doofus Jerry is a super capable, super ambitious, super smart, SUPER evil that's all going to cause big, big problems."

Reception

Collected editions

References

2016 graphic novels
2017 graphic novels
Two Jerries, A Tale of
Oni Press titles
Prequel comics
Sequel comics